David Tanaka is a fictional character from the Australian soap opera Neighbours, played by Takaya Honda. He made his first appearance in the main show during the episode broadcast on 21 September 2016. The character was introduced alongside his twin brother Leo Tanaka (Tim Kano), and they arrive in Erinsborough to find their long-lost biological father. The show's producer had planned their stories out six months in advance and was excited about the prospect of them joining the series. Both Honda and Kano auditioned for both roles and were later awarded their respective parts. David is characterised as the more self-conscious and socially awkward of the Tanaka twins, but he is career minded and confident in his role as a doctor.

Writers developed an issue-led storyline for David which saw him struggling to come to terms with his sexuality. Having been pressured by his great-grandmother Kazuko Sano (Linda Chin) to settle down with a woman, David finds it difficult to deal with his attraction to the openly gay character Aaron Brennan (Matt Wilson). The mystery of David and Leo's paternity served as the character's most prominent story during their first year in the show. Long established character Paul Robinson (Stefan Dennis) was later revealed to be their father, linking the characters to one of the show's original families. After he comes out to his family and friends, David and Aaron's partnership proved popular with viewers and they became the subjects of the first same sex marriage on Australian television in 2018. Honda's final appearance was in the last episode of the show, which aired on 28 July 2022.

Casting
The character and Honda's casting was announced on 22 August 2016, along with Tim Kano who plays David's twin brother Leo Tanaka. Of his casting, Honda said, "I feel so privileged to have the opportunity to join the regular cast of Neighbours. To learn from such prominent and longstanding Australian talent is truly seeing my dreams fulfilled." David and Leo come to Erinsborough in the hope of solving "a family mystery". David is a doctor, who has "a social conscience".

The show held a lengthy casting process for the characters because they wanted to find similar looking actors. Honda described it as a "strange" process with numerous call backs. He and Kano auditioned for both David and Leo to discover who was better suited to each role. Kano's first audition required him to switch from playing either character in a matter of seconds. Honda added that it was "tough" audition because the characters are completely different.

Development

Webisodes and introduction
Neighbours' executive producer Jason Herbison had planned the duo's storyline six months in advance. He was "delighted" to hire Honda and Kano and described watching them play the characters he had envisioned a "very thrilling" experience. Ahead of his first appearance in the main show, the character was featured in a series of webisodes titled Road Trip. The series focuses on the brothers' road trip on the way to Erinsborough, where they were joined by Leo's love interest Milly (Eliza Charley). The webisodes were designed to give viewers a chance to watch the "brotherly dynamic" the Tanaka twins share. In addition they could witness the different personalities the two characters have. David and Leo made their first screen appearance in the main show during the episode broadcast on 21 September 2016. They arrive to look after their great-grandmother Kazuko Sano (Linda Chin), who has been admitted to the local hospital. Kano revealed that the twins had another motive for being in the area as they were searching for lost relative. When David and Leo spend more time in Erinsborough they befriend  Aaron Brennan (Matt Wilson), Amy Williams (Zoe Cramond) and Elly Conway (Jodi Anasta), setting the characters up to become intertwined in one another's storylines.

Characterisation
David is characterised as kind and intelligent doctor who was born in Parramatta to an ambitious mother. Her influence taught David the importance of excelling in his medical career. His backstory details his teenage years spent focusing on studying instead of socialising. This meant the character had missed out on "normal teenage rites of passage" which resulted in him being socially awkward and self-conscious. Honda told a reporter from Tenplay that David had preferred to concentrate on his career rather than pursue romance. David been unable to understand how relationships work and coming to Erinsborough begins to change that. Playing a medic on the show requires Honda to research specific medical scenarios for hospital scenes. The production team also hired a medical adviser on-set to ensure factual accuracy. The actor told All About Soap's Claire Crick that his character was born to be a doctor. Despite it lacking in social scenarios, David's confidence excels in his work because it is a job he loves. Honda assessed that "when it comes to medicine David knows where he is and that he's good at it."

Despite being twins, David and Leo have different personalities. David is "more serious and conscientious" planning out his career path, in comparison to his impulsive entrepreneurial brother Leo. Honda believes that the two characters do share similarities ranging from a strong work ethic and sense of discipline. Though he noted that their methods of achieving their goals are completely different. They also have conflicting morals, but both believe they do things for the right reasons. Honda has described the pair as having an unspoken and "innate brotherly twin" connection which is apparent on-screen. The actor said: "it's underlying every line of dialogue and I think that Tim and I are pulling that off." Honda and Kano had natural chemistry off-set which helped them to play twins. They are both half Japanese with Caucasian mothers, which they thought was a "crazy" coincidence that helped them bond.

Paternity mystery
David's main story following his introduction to the show was his desire to find his biological father. David's initial findings lead him to a homeless man named Bradley Satchwell (Alfred Nicdao). He had been banned from visiting their mother in hospital when she gave birth. Various scenes are played out to suggest Bradley is their father. However, the character is reluctant to reveal details, and runs away. Months later Leo finds Bradley and bribes him with money to spend time with David. Bradley goes for a medical check up and is again reluctant to talk about his past. Writers introduced a "new twist" into their mystery story by ruling out Bradley as the twins father. David runs a blood test which reveals Bradley cannot be related to them.

Writers developed the story further with the introduction of Jasmine Udagawa (Kaori Maeda-Judge), an investor in the local hotel Lassiters. She has a vendetta against Leo and keeps a secret file titled "Tanaka". Amy over hears Jasmine telling Terese Willis (Rebekah Elmaloglou) that Leo could potentially inherit Lassiters and she informs him about the news. This leads Leo to believe he is related to the Udagawa family, who are also Japanese. Jasmine offers the Tanakas ten thousand dollars to leave Erinsborough. He refuses, and it leads Leo to suspect that Jasmine's uncle Hiro Udagawa is their father. Amy joins Leo in his search to track down Hiro to his last known address. However, their search is shortened when they discover that Hiro died the previous year.

The show introduced a further red herring by releasing information suggesting that historic character Scott Robinson was the father of the twins. Producers rehired actress Jenny Young to reprise her role as Kim Taylor (now Tanaka) after a thirty-two year absence. She is revealed to be David and Leo's mother, having been pregnant during her last appearance in 1985. Kim had been romantically involved with Scott, suggesting him as a possible father. The 2017 storyline develops as David discovers Kim's connection to Scott, and confronts his mother. Kim denies Scott is the twins' father, but is shocked to learn Leo has taken Amy away for a romantic weekend. She rushes to prevent the pair from sleeping together. This makes David think his theory is correct because Kim would not want Amy, who is Scott's relative, to sleep with Leo. This episode brought about the culmination of the mystery storyline as the Tanaka's biological father was revealed. In one final "twist" in the storyline, Scott's brother Paul Robinson (Stefan Dennis) was revealed to be their father. This meant that Amy is David and Leo's half-sister, which shocks the latter having fallen in love with her. The actors knew about the outcome of the story when it began but were forced to be secretive. Kano told Sarah Ellis from Inside Soap that Kim was not certain Paul was their father but knew he could be. He added that could not wait for the audience's reaction to the shock revelation.

Honda later explained that his character was nervous about forming a relationship with Paul because he is a "conservative businessman". However, unlike Leo, he accepts the news that Paul is their father. He also researched the Robinson family's history within the show to provide realism. Honda added "There has been a lot of thought in terms of history and trying to stay true to everything. We wanted to make sure that it didn't come across as just a random thing that was thrown together. We thought a lot about it."

Sexuality
David has been portrayed as struggling to come to terms with his sexuality. When he arrives in Erinsborough it becomes apparent that he is attracted to men but David ignores these feelings. Honda said that David struggles and feels pressured by those around him to make a decision. He decides to focus on work until he can make sense of his feelings. The actor explained that "he doesn't quite understand who he is or what he is attracted to. He thinks he's meant to fancy girls, but it's never really worked out with them in the past."

Honda felt pressured portraying a sensitive subject that real people experience. He wanted to make David's story "respectful and understanding" for the show's audience. On-screen, Kazuko pesters David to find himself a girlfriend to settle down with. Honda said that because of Kazuko's interference David presumes he may have not met a compatible female and even questions if there is something "wrong" with himself. When David spends time with Amy, the pair share a kiss, but David knows he is not attracted to her. The actor told Rachael Gavin from TV Soap that Amy is "an almost perfect person" for David but there is no "chemistry" between them when they kiss. He then begins to spend more time with Aaron and there is an attraction between them. Assessing David's situation Honda explained that "It tortures him because he can't understand it. He's always tried to intellectualise it and once stuff develops with Aaron he comes to more of an understanding of what is going on and then he start to break down some of the barriers." Aaron believes that David is gay following an intense moment the pair share. He warns Amy of his suspicions and confronts David, who then denies it, claiming to be heterosexual.

Aaron organises a day out for Kazuko and he urges David to question her about his father. She does not react well and David blames Aaron. He apologises to David, who thinks Aaron is trying to seduce him. He insults Aaron in a homophobic manner. David later apologises for his behaviour which leads to their "most intense" and "charged" moment together, but David stops himself from kissing Aaron and runs away. The storyline reached a turning point as David decides to confide his fears about being gay to the local priest, Father Jack Callahan (Andrew James Morley). However, writers were quick to add more turmoil to David's sexuality struggle. His great-grandmother's health begins to deteriorate in hospital. David visits Kazuko and she orders him to not pursue his homosexual feelings any further. She then dies, which leaves David feeling as though he has to adhere to her dying wish.

David receives encouragement from Paige to accept his feelings for men. David then realises he should be honest about both his sexuality and the baby. A promotional trailer released by Neighbours teased David paying a late night visit to Aaron's home to confess his feelings. However, in a twist, as the scenes aired, Aaron reveals he has just slept with another man, forcing David to hide his feelings once again. When David comes out to his family and friends he tries to kiss Aaron. Wilson told Tenplay that David acts on impulse and wants to explore his sexuality after being honest about it. He explained that Aaron wants David to have fun with other men to fully understand his sexuality. Although David interprets Aaron's advice as a rejection, Honda believed that David was not ready to be with anyone.

Relationship with Aaron Brennan
David and Aaron later begin a relationship; viewer reaction had been positive, with many hoping they would get together, even earning them the portmanteau "Daaron". Honda compared the pairing to a traditional soap opera on/off relationship. He noted that "everything that's happened with Aaron and David has been justified and there is a reality to it, which I quite like." Wilson branded their relationship as an "emotional rollercoaster", adding that they get along well with much chemistry but can suddenly become estranged because of a miscommunication. Aaron had spent many episodes pondering whether or not to be with David. Wilson believed his character was wary of David having only recently been accepting of his own sexuality. He thought it best to let David explore and not trap him in a relationship. Ultimately, Aaron found his love for David to difficult to ignore. Wilson described the character's personalities stating that "David's everything Aaron wants to be – a smart, successful, really nice guy with no enemies. Meanwhile, Aaron is everything David would like to be – open, free-spirited and enthusiastic about everything. They're very different, but opposites attract."

Writers later devised another break up for the characters. They began by planning a "disastrous proposal" of marriage, which has David asking Aaron to be his husband. Shocked by his proposal, Aaron rejects him. The storyline coincided with the legalisation of same-sex marriage in Australia. Neighbours executive producer Jason Herbison was delighted with the change, though he believed that the characters should be like all soap couples and face challenges before marrying. This was followed by the introduction of Aaron's ex-boyfriend Rory Zemiro (Ash Williams), who comes between them. Aaron met up with Rory in Paris, but never told David. Rory tells David about his encounter with Aaron, but fails to mention Aaron remained faithful. David ends his relationship with Aaron, who reacts by seeking solace in Rory. The break-up shocked fans and some even yelled at Honda over it. The actor added that the fans believed David had done wrong and should forgive Aaron.

David and Aaron get back together following his relationship with Rafael. Honda told Sasha Morris from the Daily Star that "the audience like to see a couple fight for their romance and fight to be with each other, and David definitely needs to grow from what has happened in the past." He also hoped that David and Aaron would be more intimate on-screen. Honda told Katie Baillie from Metro that Aaron wanted David back the entire time they were apart. David feels more confident to take charge of their relationship, which the actor thought was "a nice full circle" for the story.

Their relationship is soon strengthened by a proposal of marriage, to which they both agree. Producers planned the wedding storyline following the legalisation of same-sex marriage in Australia which occurred in December 2017, following a public referendum. They then hired LGBTQ+ rights activist Magda Szubanski to play a marriage celebrant to officiate their wedding. To celebrate the event, promotional photographs were released of the actors holding a Ramsay Street sign decorated in the colours of the pride flag. They also revealed that the wedding would air in September 2018. Neighbours executive producer Jason Herbison revealed that his team had been working on the storyline during the referendum. They worried that the story about "love and equality" may not have been legal when it needed to air. He added that he was delighted when it was legalised because viewers would witness an "iconic moment come to life on screen". Wilson said that many people he knew believed that Australia's previous stance on gay marriage was outdated. He expressed his delight that David and Aaron would become the first gay couple to legally marry on Australian television. Honda branded it a "historic moment in Australian television."

Relationship with Rafael Humphreys
When David and Aaron ended their relationship for a brief period in early 2018, writers created a new romance between David and Rafael Humphreys (Ryan Thomas). Rafael is introduced into the series as a "troubled" and "secretive" character. In addition, he also has a vendetta against David's father Paul. His romance with David is unexpected and not part of his plans. Thomas told Baillie from Metro that Rafael's feelings for David "caught him off guard", and the emotions he feels cause him added stress.

When the pair decide to become intimate, David discovers that Rafael has substantial scarring on his back. Rafael feels insecure, and thinks David will not be attracted to him once he sees his scars; however, David reacts positively, in a caring manner, and the two have sex. Honda told Daniel Kilkelly from Digital Spy that his character dealt with the situation well. He explained that "I think the scene is a true exposé for both characters. David is so happy because he feels that Rafael has finally opened up to him." Writers created the scene, but the director of the episode allowed Honda and Thomas to change the scene; they wanted to make it as "powerful as possible". Neighbours is a G-rated programme, but the scene was more intense and intimate than previous depictions of same-sex intimacy. It received praise from viewers, and was acknowledged by various media outlets, including Gay Times and the Evening Standard.

Rafael begins to scheme with Sue Parker (Kate Gorman) to destroy Paul's life. When David introduces Rafael to Aaron, the latter becomes suspicious and suspects his involvement with David is not genuine. Aaron sneaks into Rafael's room and finds evidence of his association with Sue. Aaron clashes with Rafael, and rips his shirt off, publicly exposing his scars. Rafael admits to sabotaging Paul's business and causing the accident which harmed Leo. He reveals that he believes Paul was directly involved in a fire which killed his mother while she was working inside Paul's factory. However, Paul is forgiving, and decides to help Rafael get answers about his mother's death.

Paul manages to prove his innocence, and they learn Dakota Davies (Sheree Murphy) was involved. As Rafael was only a guest character, his departure story was created around the discovery about Dakota. David wants to resume his relationship with Rafael, deciding that he can forgive his deceit. However, Rafael decides to go to the United Kingdom in search of Dakota, and breaks-up with David. Honda decided that David and Rafael's relationship was completely different to the one he shared with Aaron. He believed that David had "more passion" and "lustful" scenes with Rafael, adding "those scenes were powerful because they were intimate."

Planned departure and conclusion
In 2021, Honda informed producers of his intention to leave the role at the end of his contract. However, after Neighbours was cancelled in March 2022, David was able to remain on-screen until its conclusion. David's planned exit storyline, which saw him committing medical manslaughter and ultimately spending time in prison, was truncated and redeveloped to provide a happy ending for David and Aaron, a decision that Honda agreed with.

Storylines
While visiting his great-grandmother at Erinsborough Hospital, David befriends Paige Smith (Olympia Valance), who tells him about Angelina Jackson (Sarah Howett), a patient who has a brain tumour. When Karl Kennedy (Alan Fletcher) comes to check on Paige, David introduces himself and reveals that he is a first-year resident at a hospital in Sydney. He offers to contact renowned neurosurgeon Dr. Anward Adisa (Yasmin Bushby) about Angelina, earning Paige's gratitude. While talking to Karl about his residency, David memorises Karl's hospital system password. Aaron asks David and Leo about volunteering for the Blaze Outreach program and David drops off a first aid kit to Amy. She later catches him logging onto a computer using Karl's details. He admits to her and Karl that he is looking for his father, and Karl later finds information about a man named Bradley, who was banned from seeing David and Leo's mother in the hospital. Aaron sets David and Amy up on a date.

David asks Kazuko about his father but she cannot remember. David takes Kazuko out for the day. His friend Aaron Brennan brings a golf cart to them, so Kazuko does not have to walk. David shows Kazuko a picture of Bradley Satchwell, but she denies knowing him. She refuses to tell David who his father is and asks to be taken back to the hospital. David confides in Father Jack that he likes men. In hospital Kazuko's condition worsens and she tells David to renounce homosexuality, just before she dies. David tells Aaron to never speak to him again and tells Jack he was just confused about his sexuality. David supports Paige when she learns she is pregnant, and he helps her when she suffers a miscarriage scare. They later agree to tell everyone that he is the father of her baby, as Paige feels she is unable to reveal who the real father is. Paige's ex-boyfriend, Father Jack is jealous of David and Paige's friendship, and that David is being named as the father of his baby.

David and Leo want to know about their father. At first they think it may be a homeless man named Bradley Satchwell, who is taken to the hospital, where a blood test proves that he is not. Then new evidence indicates that their father may be a man named Hiro, who died a year ago, and was related to the Udagawas. His relative Jasmine tries to prevent David and Leo from investigating the family link. Clive Gibbons (Geoff Paine) investigates an old lead but can find no evidence of Hiro being related to the Tanakas. Kim denies that Hiro is the father. When Leo and Amy go on a weekend break together intending to sleep together, Kim confesses that Amy's father Paul is the twin's father. David spends time with Paul and they begin to bond. He then decides to tell Leo, Paul and Amy that he is gay. David kisses Aaron, but feels rejected when Aaron tells him that he needs to date other men first to understand who he is. David is involved in an accident, when Amy's Ute crashes into the backpackers  injuring both Piper Willis (Mavournee Hazel) and himself. The doctors' fear he may have brain damage and may have problems with his memory and speech, leaving Paul and Leo worried.

While he is recovering, David flirts with his nurse Will Dempier (Christian Heath). Will later accuses David of reporting him for inappropriate behaviour, but Paul admits that he made the complaint. David invites Will out for a drink, and explains that he has only just come out and is nervous. Will walks David home and they kiss, but Will later declines to go on another date. David then dates Aaron's former partner Tom Quill (Kane Felsinger), but Tom ends their relationship when he realises David is more invested in it than he is. David then suspects that Tom broke up with him to rekindle his relationship with Aaron, leading to him falling out with Aaron. David risks his job to treat Leo's friend Mannix Foster (Sam Webb), who has been stabbed. He steals painkillers from the hospital and tells Leo their sibling relationship is over. When Xanthe Canning (Lilly Van der Meer) is accused of taking the painkillers, David confesses his guilt to Clive Gibbons (Geoff Paine). Aaron and David make up and begin a relationship. When David and Leo receive an eviction notice, Aaron invites him to move in with him. But Paul buys the apartment next door to his and joins them together, so David chooses to stay with his family. He decides to propose to Aaron, who does not accept and walks off. He later explains to David that he felt overwhelmed, and also distracted by his brothers' problems. David admits it was intended as more of a gesture to show he was serious about their relationship. However, Aaron and David later propose to each other and marry, before buying 32 Ramsay Street with a view to starting a family in the future.

When the sociopathic Finn Kelly (Rob Mills) awakes from a coma with retrograde amnesia, David is fascinated by his case and regularly meets with Finn to study his psychological development. After David learns Aaron has kept Ned Willis's (Ben Hall) involvement in an illegal fight club from him, they argue and David goes out for a bike ride. He is struck by Amy's ute, which is being driven by a tired Kyle Canning (Chris Milligan). Terese finds David and he is rushed to hospital, where he has to undergo surgery to remove a kidney. When the other kidney starts to fail, David is put on dialysis and a donor is sought. David's condition worsens when he gets an infection and his other organs start to shut down. Leo flies back to Erinsborough to get tested, but he is not a match. Harlow Robinson (Jemma Donovan) asks her father Robert Robinson (Adam Hunter) to get tested and when he is found to be a match, he agrees to donate his kidney. Shortly before the surgery, Robert escapes from the hospital. Harlow persuades him to return and he goes through with the transplant. As he recovers, David reads his medical file and learns Roxy Willis (Zima Anderson) was also a match. She apologises for not telling anyone, as she was scared, and David forgives her.

David and Aaron plan on having a child via surrogate, and ask Pierce's former partner Lisa Rowsthorn (Jane Allsop) to be their surrogate, but Lisa declines when she finds out she is already pregnant. When Finn's memories return and he murders Gary Canning (Damien Richardson), David blames himself for not noticing anything suspicious. David and Aaron become foster parents to teenager Emmett Donaldson (Ezra Justin), despite initially requesting a younger child, and soon form a close bond with him. They later take in Emmett's older brother, Brent Colefax (Texas Watterston), as well. After both boys leave, David and Aaron renew their investigation into conceiving through a surrogate, with David as biological father due to Aaron carrying the Huntington's disease gene, and are stunned when their housemate Nicolette Stone (Charlotte Chimes) offers to carry their baby. Although Nicolette successfully conceives, matters are complicated when she begins a relationship with Aaron's sister Chloe Brennan (April Rose Pengilly), and Emmett and Brent return for a time. David also struggles to trust that Nicolette will honour their agreement to relinquish primary care of the baby to David and Aaron.

When Nicolette suddenly leaves Erinsborough close to her due date, David is distraught and risks his career by attempting to find information on her whereabouts through medical records. He also disowns Leo for scheming to come between Chloe and Nicolette, and accuses Aaron of caring less about their child, but eventually works through his anger. Paul searches for Nicolette and returns to Erinsborough with Abigail Tanaka (Mary Finn), who is believed to be Nicolette, David and Aaron's daughter, Isla Tanaka-Brennan (Axelle Austin; also Finn). Paul later tells David that he paid Nicolette to stay away, and he reluctantly agrees to not inform Aaron, Terese or Jane. Subsequently, David persuades Jesse Porter (Cameron Robbie) to distance himself from Terese to prevent Paul's bribe from coming to light. Their deceptions are exposed when Abigail's mother, Britney Barnes (Montana Cox), briefly kidnaps her baby, prompting Nicolette to return and reveal the truth about the two infants. David, Aaron and Nicolette then uneasily begin to co-parent Isla, despite the trust issues between them. Fearful of Nicolette running away again, David and Aaron use Paul's help to hire lawyers in an attempt to gain full custody, but eventually agree to a shared parenting arrangement.

Reception
David and Aaron's partnership was nominated for Best Soap Couple at the 2018 Digital Spy Reader Awards; they came in seventh place with 5.3% of the total votes.

Daniel Kilkelly (Digital Spy) viewed the Road Trip webisodes and observed David as "less confident and a whole lot more insecure" than Leo. He added that the character appeared to have a bigger conscience than his twin. Annabel Ross of The Canberra Times said that Neighbours used "some refreshingly real terminology" when David and Paige discussed his sexuality. She added that she could never imagine the same conversation being screened on rival soap opera Home and Away. Lewis Corner (Gay Times) said that "our temperature has suddenly soared" following David's introduction to the show. The character's sexuality storyline also re-engaged his attention to the show. Sandra Powell writing for What's on TV believed that David had been "a man on a mission" from the beginning in his quest to find his father. Writing for Stuff.co.nz, Kerry Harvey said "the twins are starkly different in personality with David a doctor with a social conscience, while Kano's Leo is a shameful opportunist." A writer from Soap World said "ever since the mysterious Tanaka brothers arrived in Erinsborough questions about David’s love life have been swirling." They added that David and Aaron's scenes were "fraught with tension".

Anthony D. Langford often scrutinised the character in his weekly TVSource Magazine column. He leveled criticism at Neighbours slow writing and development of David's paternity mystery, personality and relationships. He believed that David's sexuality story was too long-winded. When David began to regret posing as the father to Paige's child, the critic commented, "I'm glad as this story has dragged on long enough." Of David's paternity, the columnist opined that it was a story that became "bigger" as it progressed and appeared to be linked to the show's history. He added his hopes of the Tanaka's father being an important character to the show or it risked the storyline being aired for no reason.

He also took issue with David's possible romance with Aaron, opining that the two did not share enough screen-time to form a relationship. In addition he accused the show of missing out important scenes the two could have shared. Langford grew so tired of waiting that he later scathed "this show is dragging out Aaron and David getting together to the point of it being ridiculous." He also pondered whether Neighbours were intentionally avoiding the portrayal of gay male intimacy. Langford was also unsure David and Aaron were well matched. He branded David as an "okay" character lacking personality. He did not believe Aaron should be partnered with yet another "bland nice guy" such as David, as it risked writers being unable to create stories for the "dull coupling". In 2022, Sam Strutt of The Guardian compiled a feature counting down the top ten most memorable moments from Neighbours. Strutt listed David and Aaron's wedding as the eighth most memorable. Strutt branded it the show's most memorable wedding since the ceremony of Scott Robinson and Charlene Mitchell.

References

External links
 David Tanaka at the Official Neighbours website

Neighbours characters
Television characters introduced in 2016
Fictional physicians
Fictional gay males
Fictional Japanese people
Fictional twins
Fictional LGBT characters in television
Male characters in television
Robinson family (Neighbours)